Neofriseria singula, the mottled groundling, is a moth of the family Gelechiidae. It was described by Otto Staudinger in 1876. It is found in most of Europe, except Norway, Finland, Belgium, Switzerland, Italy, the Balkan Peninsula and Ukraine. The habitat consists of heathlands.

The wingspan is 12–14 mm. Adults are on wing in June and July.

The larvae feed on Rumex acetosella. They feed from within a tube made from silk, which is located on the lower stem.

References

 Neofriseria singula in ukmoths

Moths described in 1876
Neofriseria
Moths of Europe